Sandalio Simeón Consuegra Castellón [con-SWEH-grah] (September 3, 1920 – November 16, 2005) was a Cuban-born Major League Baseball pitcher with the Washington Senators (1950-1953), Chicago White Sox (1953-1956), Baltimore Orioles (1956-1957) and New York Giants (1957). He batted and threw right-handed.

In an eight-season career, Consuegra posted a 51–32 record with 26 saves and a 3.37 ERA in 809.1 innings. He pitched in 248 games, starting 71 of them.

A native of Potrerillo, a town from the municipality of Cruces in the province of   Cienfuegos, Cuba, Consuegra made his major league debut in 1950 with the Washington Senators when he was 29 years old. Previously, he had played with the Havana Cubans, the first Cuban team in the American minor league system.

The Chicago White Sox purchased Consuegra from Washington in the 1953 midseason. He went 16–3 during his  All-Star season with the White Sox, leading the American League with a .842 winning percentage, and included a league-high eight relief wins without a defeat. His 2.69 ERA was second in the league to the Cleveland Indians' Mike Garcia (2.64).

Consuegra also played with the Baltimore Orioles and New York Giants. He announced his retirement at the end of the 1957-58 Cuban winter-ball season, though he made a brief comeback in the minors in 1961.

Following his playing career, Consuegra settled in Miami, Florida, where he died at age 85.

Sources

SABR BioProject
Sandy Consuegra - Baseballbiography.com
Historical Baseball
Baseball Reference minor league statistics

1920 births
2005 deaths
American League All-Stars
Baltimore Orioles players
Charlotte Hornets (baseball) players
Chicago White Sox players
Havana Cubans players
Havana Sugar Kings players
Major League Baseball pitchers
Major League Baseball players from Cuba
Cuban expatriate baseball players in the United States
New York Giants (NL) players
Vancouver Mounties players
Washington Senators (1901–1960) players
People from Cienfuegos Province